Sasanidus kermanshahensis, is a species of loach in the family Nemacheilidae endemic to Karkheh and Karun drainages in Iran. This species is the only member of its genus.

References

Cypriniformes
Monotypic fish genera
Fish described in 1966
Taxa named by Petre Mihai Bănărescu
Taxa named by Teodor T. Nalbant